The 1986 King Cup was the 28th season of the knockout competition since its establishment in 1956. Al-Ettifaq were the defending champions but they were eliminated by Al-Tai in the quarter-finals.

Al-Nassr won their 4th title after defeating Al-Ittihad 1–0 in the final. This was their first title since 1981.

Bracket

Note:     H: Home team,   A: Away team  

Source: Al Jazirah

Round of 16
The matches of the Round of 16 were held on 6 and 7 January 1986.

Quarter-finals
The Quarter-final matches were held on 10 January 1986.

Semi-finals
The four winners of the quarter-finals progressed to the semi-finals. The semi-finals were played on 13 January 1986. All times are local, AST (UTC+3).

Final
The final was played between Al-Nassr and Al-Ittihad in the Youth Welfare Stadium in Al-Malaz, Riyadh. Al-Ittihad were appearing in their 10th while Al-Nassr were appearing in their 7th final.

Top goalscorers

References

1986
Saudi Arabia
Cup